The Chinese Elm cultivar Ulmus parvifolia 'Burgundy' is a small American development.

Description
The tree rarely exceeds 6 m in height, and has a broad, rounded form. The leaves are relatively large, dark-green, turning a deep burgundy in autumn. The exfoliating mottled bark is a rich orange-brown.

Pests and diseases
The species and its cultivars are highly resistant, but not immune, to Dutch elm disease, and completely unaffected by the Elm Leaf Beetle Xanthogaleruca luteola.

Cultivation
'Burgundy' is not known to be in cultivation beyond North America.

Etymology
Presumably named for the colour of its autumn foliage.

Accessions

North America

Scott Arboretum, US. Acc. no. 2003-261
U S National Arboretum , Washington, D.C., US. Acc. no. 62211.

Nurseries

North America

(Widely available)

References

External links
http://www.ces.ncsu.edu/depts/hort/consumer/factsheets/trees-new/cultivars/ulmus_parvifolia.htm Ulmus parvifolia cultivar list. 
https://web.archive.org/web/20030413074605/http://fletcher.ces.state.nc.us/programs/nursery/metria/metria11/warren/elm.htm Return of the Elm - the status of elms in the nursery industry in 2000. Warren, K., J. Frank Schmidt and Co.

Chinese elm cultivar
Ulmus articles missing images
Ulmus